The Barrow is a hamlet in Gloucestershire, England.

ISS Boddington is within the hamlet.

References

External links

Villages in Gloucestershire